Maxime Goulet (born June 7, 1980) is a Montreal-based Canadian composer who writes concert music as well as video game soundtracks. He currently teaches composition at the University of Sherbrooke. in Quebec, Canada.

Early life and education 
Maxime Goulet was born and raised in Montreal, Canada to a French speaking family. He studied music composing at Université de Montréal with Alan Belkin. He earned his B. Mus. in 2005 and his Master's degree in 2007. Later, he attended several trainings and master classes, namely at the Festival international du film d'Aubagne in 2007, and the ASCAP Film Scoring Workshop, with Richard Bellis in Los Angeles in 2009.

Career

Concert music 
The concert music of Maxime Goulet has been performed by a wide range of ensembles and musicians in countries around the world, including the Montreal Symphony Orchestra, the Toronto Symphony Orchestra, the Vancouver Opera, the Orchestre Philharmonique de Liège, the Houston Symphony, the Vancouver Symphony Orchestra, the Orchestre Régional de Basse Normandie, the National Art Center Orchestra, the Orchestre Symphonique de Québec, the Orchestre Métropolitain, the Pacific Opera Victoria, the Ensemble Symphonique Neuchâtel, Angèle Dubeau & La Pietà.

Some of Goulet's works entered David Daniels' Orchestral Music Handbook.

In 2008, the Vancouver Symphony Orchestra commissions him the overture Citius, Altius, Fortius! to celebrate the 2010 Winter Olympics. In 2017, the work is featured on the album Les plaisirs coupables of the Sherbrooke Symphony Orchestra, as well as on the album Jean-Willy Kunz: Au grand orgue Pierre-Béique, published at ATMA Classique.

In 2011–2012, as part of the Brott Music Festival, he was Composer-in-Residence for the National Academy Orchestra of Canada. During his residency, he composed Symphonic Chocolates, an orchestral suite meant to accompany chocolate tasting. In 2014, the work is recorded by the Prague FILMharmonic orchestra and released on the album Chocolats symphoniques.

In 2013–2014, he was Composer-in-Residence for McGill Chamber Orchestra. During his residency, he composed the clarinet concerto Fishing Story.

In 2017, he composed a movement of the collective work La Symphonie d'Hochelaga, commissioned for the 375th anniversary of Montreal and premiered by Orchestre Métropolitain.

That same year, he was also commissioned, for the 150th anniversary of Canada, to compose United Anthems, an orchestral mashup of 35 national anthems from around the world, as part of a Canada-wide project launched by the Toronto Symphony Orchestra.

In 2018, he composed a piano concerto titled Checkmate and inspired by the legendary 1996 match, in which IBM's Deep Blue computer defeated former world chess champion Garry Kasparov. It was commissioned and premiered by the River Oaks Chamber Orchestra and pianist Lara Downes.

His opera The Flight of the Hummingbird, on a libretto by Michael Nicoll Yahgulanaas and Barry Gilson, commissioned by the Vancouver Opera and the Pacific Opera Victoria, was premiered in 2020.

In 2020, he published the song cycle Micro Meteo as a series of short videos

Video game music 
Between 2007 and 2013, Maxime Goulet has been staff composer for Gameloft. During his tenure, he wrote music for video games such as Brothers in Arms 3: Sons of War, The Amazing Spiderman, Dungeon Hunter: Alliance, Dungeon Hunter 4, Order & Chaos Online, Wild Blood, Shrek Forever After and Iron Man 2.

Since 2013, Maxime Goulet has been working as a freelance video game composer. He has composed music for games such as Warhammer 40,000: Eternal Crusade, Roller Coaster Tycoon World and Ancestors: The Humankind Odyssey.

In 2017, along with Orchestre Métropolitain and conductor Dina Gilbert, he created The Montreal Video Game Symphony, a multimedia concert that features music of games developed in the city of Montreal

List of works 
A selection of concert music composition by Maxime Goulet.

Orchestral works
2007: A Puppet Parade
2008: Citius, altius, fortius!
2012: Symphonic Aerobic Dance
2012: Symphonic Chocolates
2014: On Halloween Night
2017: United Anthems
2017: Symphonic Factory
2017: Beach Ball Games for Orchestra
2023: Ice Storm Symphony

Concertante
2014: Fishing Story for Clarinet and String Orchestra
2016: Beatles Fantasy for Violin and Orchestra
2017: A Bassoon Circus for Bassoon and Orchestra
2018: Checkmate! for Piano and Orchestra

Operas
2012: Bungalopolis (collective work)
2020: The Flight of the Hummingbird

Chamber music
2004: Watercolour for Piano
2005: The Wool-Spinning Devil for Narrator, Clarinet, Cello and Piano
2006: On a Tightrope for String Quartet
2011: What a Day for String Orchestra
2014: Concertized Introductions for String Orchestra
2015: Level Up! for Keyboard and String Orchestra
2020: Micro météo for Tenor and Piano

List of game music 
A selection of video games for which Maxime Goulet has composed music (as main composer or as additional music composer).

References

External links 
 Official website
 Symphonic Chocolates
 Montreal Video Game Symphony
 The Flight of the Hummingbird

1980 births
Living people
21st-century Canadian composers
Video game composers
Academic staff of the Université de Sherbrooke
Musicians from Montreal
Canadian classical composers
Université de Montréal alumni